Bird Key is a small uninhabited island within the city of Miami, Florida, United States.  It is located in Biscayne Bay, just east of the Upper Eastside neighborhood and south of the 79th Street Causeway.

It is one of only two naturally-formed islands in the upper bay and is the only privately owned, uninhabited island.

Visiting the island without the owner's consent is considered trespassing. Trespassers disturb the colony of diverse, native birds that have used the island as a rookery for centuries.

See ‘References’ section for links to more information about Bird Key's history and current status.

References
'The island that Miami forgot: Historic Bird Key teems with pelicans, egrets, ibises — and trash,' by Terence Cantarella (Miami Herald)

Islands of Miami
Uninhabited islands of Miami-Dade County, Florida
Islands of Florida
Private islands of Florida